William Allen Alsop  (12 December 1947 – 12 May 2018) was a British architect and Professor of Architecture at University for the Creative Arts's Canterbury School of Architecture.

He was responsible for several distinctive and controversial modernist buildings which are usually distinguished by their use of bright colours and unusual avant-garde forms. In 2000, Alsop won the Stirling Prize, the most prestigious architecture award in the United Kingdom, for the Peckham Library in London.

Biography
Alsop always wanted to be an architect, even before he really knew what architects did; when he was six years old, he designed a house for his mother to live in – its most striking specification was that it had to be built in New Zealand. When he was 16 his father, an accountant, died, and being bored with school he left to work for an architect, doing his A-levels at evening classes.

He was greatly influenced by his drawing tutor, Henry Bird while at foundation course at Northampton Art School. He recalled how he was taught to draw by him. He gave me a brick, told me to draw it and promptly left the room. I proceeded to draw it with all its shadows. On his return he went into a rage and chastised me for destroying the vision with shading, shouting: 'What is wrong with a simple line?' He insisted that I redo the drawing with line only so that I could begin to see the brick and its proportions. I drew that brick for two three hour sessions per week, line only, for three months. Eventually, he admitted that I had mastered the brick and I was allowed to progress onto the tin can.

Alsop then studied at the Architectural Association School of Architecture where at 23 he entered the competition to design the Centre Georges Pompidou in Paris and came second to the eventual winners, Richard Rogers & Renzo Piano. He worked briefly for Maxwell Fry and Jane Drew, a couple who had been instrumental in introducing modernism to Britain in the 1930s, then joined Cedric Price for four years.

After a short period with Roderick Ham, in 1981 Alsop set up a practice, Alsop & Lyall, with his classmate John Lyall in Hammersmith. Jan Störmer later joined the practice and a decade later, in 1991, the practice was renamed Alsop & Störmer after Lyall's departure.

Alsop's first major commission was a swimming pool for Sheringham in Norfolk in 1984, followed by a visitor centre for Cardiff Bay. Thereafter he worked on a number of projects in Germany, including the Hamburg Ferry Terminal. In 1992, Alsop came first, against competitor Norman Foster, in the competition to design the Hôtel du département des Bouches-du-Rhône (the county government office of Bouches-du-Rhône) in Marseille, France. The building, now considered a major work of late 20th century architecture and a Marseille landmark, nicknamed Le Grand Bleu, was designed by Alsop and Störmer, and developed its visual identity through the design process in collaboration with the architectural artist Brian Clarke, with the completed building externally clad in Yves Klein blue glass, with one elevation formed of a 1,200 m2 artwork by Clarke screenprinted in ceramic glaze onto the facade. Alsop and Störmer divided into separate practices in 2000, with Alsop renaming the practice Alsop Architects.

Alsop admitted to never being very good at handling finances, and his practice went through several difficult periods, including the cancellation in June 2004 of plans to build a "Fourth Grace" to be built on Liverpool's Pier Head waterfront. Since 2001–2002, three historical buildings at the Pier Head in Liverpool have been known as the "Three Graces": they are the Royal Liver Building (1908–11) by Walter Aubrey Thomas, the Cunard Building (1914–16) by Willinck & Thicknesse with Arthur J. Davis, and the Port of Liverpool Building (1903–07) by Briggs & Wolstenholme with Hobbs & Thornely – the so-called "Cloud Building" – officially because of rising costs and unrealistic design.

In early 2006, Alsop sold his practice to a design conglomerate called the SMC Group to concentrate on architecture.

After leaving ARCHIAL (formerly Alsop Architects, then SMC Alsop), he joined RMJM's London Headquarters as International Principal on 1 October 2009. The office's name was "Will Alsop at RMJM". Alsop's latest practice was called All Design and has practices in London and Chongqing. Alsop's London office is located in Battersea.

Alsop was a tutor of sculpture at Central Saint Martins College of Art and Design in London for several years, and has held many other academic posts, among others at the Vienna University of Technology, Universities of London and Hannover, and actively promotes the artistic contribution to built environments.

In 2013, Alsop became Professor of Architecture at the University for the Creative Arts's Canterbury School of Architecture.

Alsop has been made an Officer of the Order of the British Empire (OBE), and was elected to the Royal Academy on 18 May 2000.

Architectural style

Alsop's architectural heroes were Le Corbusier, Sir John Soane, John Vanbrugh and Mies van der Rohe. His avant-garde, modernist buildings are usually distinguished by their vibrant use of bright colour and unusual forms. Before Alsop begins to work on a new project, he uses painting to clear his mind, think freely and create an uncontaminated design approach.  "One of the reasons for painting is that you are not really in control of what you are doing – and that interests me a lot. Instead of having a specific starting point, which perhaps, in architectural terms, would lead through to a series of logical thoughts working towards a designed building, you can start anywhere." 
For him, the act of painting together with working closely with the client and the local community are necessary ingredients in urban design and architecture.

In 2004, Alsop published a book entitled Supercity which elicited much debate. It was the subject of a Channel 4 television documentary and an exhibition at the Urbis museum in Manchester. This book described his vision of a "Supercity" – a futuristic conurbation – stretching along the M62 corridor from Liverpool to Hull. It included a discussion of how the increasing interconnectivity of the cities along this corridor is changing the concepts of a "city", and how they can be developed to merge the idea of the rural and urban. It also included a number of architectural ideas of possible buildings and communities in this city. Although there was some political support for his ideas, with The Times claiming that former British Deputy Prime Minister John Prescott was a supporter, the Supercity has its critics.

Alsop featured significantly in Iain Sinclair's book Ghost Milk (2011), especially the chapter "In the belly of the architect". The book is a critique – written using the literary technique of psychogeography – of the capital used to drive through vanity planning projects such as the London Olympics, and Alsop's unbuilt planning projects in the north of England, such as Supercity, are seen as typical of these, where the architect fantasizes about how architectural design solves social and economic problems.

Alsop's architectural talents may be the subject of controversy  built up an international reputation and a degree of celebrity and professional recognition, described by the Observer as "number three in the hierarchy of British architects after Lords Rogers and Foster".

Notwithstanding this, like fellow avantgardist Dame Zaha Hadid, he actualised relatively few buildings from his designs. Alsop estimated that only about 10% of his designs have been built, something he stated did not worry him because of the enjoyment he derived in designing buildings even without a particular commission or competition in mind. In a 2007 interview, Alsop stated "It's like tennis – you have to keep doing it all the time, whether you have a client or not. I believe that absolutely. You can speculate in your sketchbook – you're allowed to think about anything, with or without a client."

In April 2007, The Observer commented that Alsop's approach to architecture could broadly be defined by his statement: "I like people. I hope it shows."

Major architectural projects

{| class=wikitable
|-
! Image !! Information !! Awards and nominations
|- valign=top
|
|
Cardiff Bay Visitor Centre
Cardiff, Wales
Completed 1991, demolished 2010.
|
 Royal Institute of British Architects (RIBA) Regional Award for Architecture (1991).
 RIBA National Award for Architecture (1992)
|- valign=top
|
|
Hamburg Ferry Terminal
Hamburg-Altona, Germany
Completed 1993 (with :de:Jan Störmer, Hamburg)
|
|- valign=top
|
|
Hôtel du département des Bouches-du-Rhône (Le Grand Bleu)
Marseille, Bouches-du-Rhône, France
Completed 1994 (with Brian Clarke)
|
Stirling Prize nominee (1997)
RIBA Worldwide Projects Award (1997)
RIBA Civic & Community Architecture Award (1995)
Palmarés Award for Architecture (1995)
|- valign=top
|
|
North Greenwich tube station
Greenwich, London, England
Completed 1999
|
Stirling Prize nominee (1999)
|- valign=top
|
|
Peckham Library
Peckham, London, England
Completed 2000
|
Stirling Prize (2000)
Civic Trust Award (2003)
|- valign=top
|
|
Muzinq Almere (nox), Doorworld and MediaMarkt
Almere, Netherlands
Completed 2002
|
|- valign=top
|
|
Sharp Centre for Design, Ontario College of Art & Design
Toronto, Ontario, Canada
Completed 2004
|
RIBA Worldwide Award (2004)
City of Toronto Urban Design Award (2006)
|- valign=top
|
|
Fawood Children's Centre
Harlesden, North London, England
Completed in 2004
|
Stirling Prize nominee (2005)
|- valign=top
|
|
Ben Pimlott Building, Goldsmiths, University of London
New Cross, London, England
Completed 2005
|
|- valign=top
|
|
Blizard Building, Barts and The London School of Medicine and Dentistry
Whitechapel, London, England
Completed March 2005
|
Civic Trust Award (2006)
RIBA Regional Award (London) (2006)
|- valign=top
|
|
Alsop Toronto Sales Centre for Westside Lofts (1151 Queen Street West)
Toronto, Ontario, Canada
Completed 2006
|
|- valign=top
|
|
Palestra, 197
Blackfriars Road, Southwark, London, England
Completed 2006
|
 RIBA Regional Award (London) (2007)
Private Eye magazine Sir Hugh Casson Award for the Worst New Building (2006)
|- valign=top
|
|
Quay Redevelopment project
Clarke Quay, Singapore
Completed 2006
|
|- valign=top
|
|
The Public, West Bromwich
West Bromwich, West Midlands, England
Part completed 2008
|
Private Eye magazine Sir Hugh Casson Award for the Worst New Building (2008)
|- valign=top
|
|
Stratford Docklands Light Railway Station
Stratford, London, England
Commissioned in 2003, completed in 2007
|
|- valign=top
|
|
Yonkers Power Plant project
Glenwood Waterfront, Yonkers, New York, United States
Completion expected in 2008
|
|- valign=top
|
|
KingTowns
King West Village, Toronto, Ontario, Canada
Estimated completion date unknown
|
|- valign=top
|
|
New Islington
Manchester, England
Completed 2009
|
|- valign=top
|
|
Westside Gallery Lofts 1151 Queen Street West – 8-storey condo lofts (135 units)
Toronto, Ontario, Canada
Completed 2012
|
|- valign=top
|
|
Raffles City Apartment Hotel
Beijing, China
Completed 2009
|
 2008 Cityscape Asia Awards, Best Future Mixed-Use Development|- valign=top
|

|
Gao Yang International Cruise Terminal
Shanghai, China
Completed 2009/2010
|
|-
|
|Testbed1 Cultural Centre
Battersea, London
Completed 2009
|
|}

Academic appointments and honorary positions
Alsop was an ongoing professor of architecture at the Vienna University of Technology and received many honorary doctorates such as the honorary Doctorate of Civil Law (DCL) by the University of East Anglia and honorary doctorates at Ryerson University and OCAD University.

 1997-Ongoing Professor, Technical University of Vienna
 1997 Professor, The London Institute
 1990 Visiting Professor, University of Hanover
 1988 Unit Master, Architectural Association
 1986 Visiting Professor, Bremen Academy of Art & Music
 1984 Visiting Professor, Royal Melbourne Institute Design
 1984 Visiting Professor, New South Wales Institute of Technology
 1982 The Davis Professor, Tulane University, New Orleans 
 1977 Visiting Professor, San Francisco Institute of Art 
 1977 Visiting Professor, Ball State University, Indiana
 1973 Tutor in Sculpture, St Martin's School of Art 

Exhibitions
Alsop was known to be constantly drawing and painting either for his architectural work or for his own sake. His paintings and sketches have been exhibited alongside his architectural projects in dedicated exhibitions at Sir John Soane's Museum, Milton Keynes Gallery, Cube Gallery in Manchester, and the British Pavilion at the Venice Biennale, among other venues.

Alsop was a patron of the charity The Nightingale Project , which uses the arts to enhance the environment in hospitals, and has exhibited his paintings in a London hospital under the auspices of this charity. Alsop also conducted a series of workshops with psychiatric patients at London's St Charles, Chelsea and Westminster hospitals, creating large communal artworks. He has been chair of the board of Trustees of The Architecture Foundation.

Major Exhibitions:
 2011 – Proper Behaviour in the Park, Royal Academy of Arts, London
 2007 – Towards..., Chelsea Space, London
 2007 – Future City, The Barbican, London
 2007 – Cultural Fog, Olga Korper Gallery, Toronto
 2007 – Bathing Beauties, The Hub:National Centre for Craft & Design, Lincolnshire
 2007 – Creative Prisons, Touring exhibition
 2005 – Supercities, Urbis, Manchester
 2005 – Groundswell; MoMA, New York City
 2004 – Middlehaven Masterplan, Venice Biennale
 2002 – Malagarba Works, Will Alsop & Bruce McLean: Milton Keynes Gallery
 2002 – All Barnsley Might Dream, Venice Biennale
 2002 – Beauty, Joy & the Real, Sir John Soane Museum, London
 2001 – Not Architecture, Aedes East Gallery, Berlin
 2000 – Venice Biennale, British Pavilion
 2000 – National Institute of Architecture (NAI), Rotterdam
 1998 – Alsop Paintings & Architecture, Architekturgalerie, Stuttgart
 1997 – River of Dreams, Mayor Gallery, London
 1995 – Exhibition of Paintings, The Mayor Gallery, London
 1992 – Selected Projects Exhibition, Aedes Gallery, Berlin
 1992 – Arc en Rêve, Hôtel du Département, Marseilles, Bordeaux
 1987 – Bridge/Beam/Floor/Roof, The Architecture Centre, Bremen
 1985 – Paris Biennale Exhibition
 1974 – Group Exhibition: Fruit Market, Edinburgh

Personal life
Alsop and his wife lived between an Edwardian mansion flat in London and a converted stable block in Norfolk. They have three adult children.

He had a twin sister who still lives in Northampton.

Alsop would try to relax as much as possible on weekends and also took a month off in the summer to go painting in Menorca with his friend Bruce McLean. Alsop enjoyed smoking and drinking. He was, according to an April 2007 article in The Observer, "obviously not a man familiar with gyms".

Alsop died in London after a short illness on 12 May 2018 at the age of 70.

Notes

References

Further reading

Articles

 Bissell, Gerhard, "Alsop, Will", in: Allgemeines Künstlerlexikon (Artists of the World)'', Suppl. I, Saur, Munich 2005, p. 252 (in German).

Books

External links
Official website of Will Alsop

Will Alsop at the British Council website
Will Alsop at the "From Here to Modernity" website on Open2.net, the online learning portal from the Open University and the BBC 
Will Alsop at the Royal Academy of Arts website
Radio interview of William Alsop on 4 April 2005 at the A Palaver website (available as stream)
Interview with Will Alsop (video)

1947 births
2018 deaths
 
Architects from Northamptonshire
Stirling Prize laureates
Officers of the Order of the British Empire
Royal Academicians
People from Northampton
Alumni of the University of Northampton
Alumni of the Architectural Association School of Architecture